Dylan Wenzel-Halls (born 15 December 1997) is an Australian footballer who plays as a striker for Central Coast Mariners in the A-League. He previously played for Olympic FC and Western Pride FC in National Premier Leagues Queensland as well as Brisbane Roar in the A-League.

Club career

Youth career
Wenzel-Halls played youth football at local club Ipswich Knights FC, played junior U8 through to U15 at Brisbane Lions FC and then at Olympic FC from 2013 to 2015, and with Brisbane Roar FC Youth in 2016.

Western Pride
In the 2017 NPL Queensland grand final, Wenzel-Halls scored an 89th-minute free kick against Moreton Bay United, winning the match 2-1 and securing Pride’s first piece of silverware. He was named in the 2017 NPL QLD Team of the Year, and won the 2018 Queensland NPL Golden Boot with 24 goals in 14 games.

While playing for Western Pride, Wenzel-Halls broke the record for the most goals scored in a single National Premier Leagues match, scoring seven goals in a 15–0 win over Sunshine Coast FC.

Brisbane Roar
On 4 May 2018, following his goal-scoring exploits in the NPL, Wenzel-Halls signed a one-year contract with A-League club Brisbane Roar.

He made his professional debut on 24 November 2018 against Melbourne City, replacing Matt McKay in injury time with the Roar going on to win the match 2–0.

Wenzel-Halls grabbed his first A-League assist in a 2-1 loss to Adelaide United on 30 November 2018, providing the cutback for Henrique’s goal. He scored his first A-League goal in a Round 17 clash with Adelaide United on 2 February 2019, scoring the Roar’s second goal as they went down 4-3 at Hindmarsh Stadium.

Western United
On 20 June 2021, Wenzel-Halls left Brisbane Roar and joined Western United, signing a three-year contract. In January 2023, Wenzel-Halls departed the club by mutual consent to allow him pursue another opportunity.

Central Coast Mariners
A couple of days after leaving , it was announced by Central Coast Mariners that they had signed Wenzel-Halls until the end of the 2024–25 season.

Honours

Club
Western United
A-League Men Championship: 2021–22

References

Living people
1992 births
Brisbane Roar FC players
Western United FC players
Central Coast Mariners FC players
National Premier Leagues players
A-League Men players
Australian soccer players
Association football forwards